Hiram E. Puig-Lugo (born July 8, 1961) is an associate judge of the Superior Court of the District of Columbia.

Education and career 
Puig-Lugo earned his Bachelor of Science in 1984 from University of Wisconsin-Madison & his Juris Doctor in 1988 from University of Wisconsin Law School.

D.C. Superior Court 
President Bill Clinton nominated Puig-Lugo on January 6, 1999, to a fifteen-year term as an associate judge on the Superior Court of the District of Columbia to the seat vacated by Judge Arthur L. Burnett. On April 20, 1999, the Senate Committee on Governmental Affairs held a hearing on his nomination. On May 20, 1999, the Committee reported his nomination favorably to the senate floor. On May 26, 1999, the full United States Senate confirmed his nomination by voice vote.

On April 4, 2014, the Commission on Judicial Disabilities and Tenure recommended that President Obama reappoint him to second fifteen-year term as a judge on the D.C. Superior Court.

References

1961 births
Living people
21st-century American judges
Judges of the Superior Court of the District of Columbia
People from San Germán, Puerto Rico
University of Wisconsin Law School alumni
University of Wisconsin–Madison alumni